The Grizzly Win Mag pistols were conceived, invented, designed, engineered and developed in the 1980s by the sole inventor, Perry Arnett, who licensed his patent for an interchangeable caliber semi-automatic pistol to L.A.R. Manufacturing Inc.  Perry Arnett's designs were initially flawed and were improved upon by Heinz Augat (former owner and founder of L.A.R. Manufacturing Inc.). The L.A.R. Grizzly was the most powerful semi-automatic pistol ever commercially produced after the Desert Eagle (the Mark V was chambered in .50 AE to compete with the IMI Desert Eagle).

Background
The LAR Grizzly pistol was a modified Colt M1911 style pistol with oversize components designed to handle larger, more powerful cartridges than could be used in the standard size 1911 pistol. The original prototype built by Perry Arnett was made from two Colt 1911 frames and slides cut and welded to accommodate the .45 Winchester Magnum round, with two steel doubler plates welded to the slide flats to retard the action and increase strength.

Between 1983 and 1999, approximately 15,000 guns were produced in four versions capable of firing six different cartridges. All guns were hand fitted and capable of high accuracy.

The Grizzly is an oversize  of the Colt M1911 design, and most parts are interchangeable with those of the standard size pistols of other manufacturers. The Mark I model, offered in the mid 1980s was developed to fire the powerful .45 Winchester Magnum round. At various times, conversion kits were sold allowing the pistol to fire other rounds, including .45 ACP, 10 mm Auto, and .357 Magnum. Later, the Mark IV model was designed specifically to handle high pressure .44 Magnum loads, and the Mark V was designed to chamber the still more potent .50 AE. The 357/45 Grizzly WinMag .357-.45 GWM was a powerful wildcat round designed for the LAR Grizzly pistol.

The standard Grizzly models had a 5.5" slide, most often seen fitted with a 6.5" barrel which extends one inch beyond the slide, and less commonly with a 5.5" barrel in combination with a factory fitted bushing style recoil compensator. Special models with 8" and 10" barrels for hunting and silhouette competition were also produced (in small quantities).

A Grizzly caliber conversion kit typically included a barrel, a magazine, an ejector, an extractor, a barrel bushing, and a recoil spring. Some also included a bushing type recoil compensator and a wrench for use with the compensator.

Operation
The standard recoil spring used in the Mark I and II pistols chambered for the .45 Winchester Magnum has a 27lb rating, compared to the 16lb rating for a standard M1911 pistol chambered for .45 ACP. The heavy spring, combined with the greater inertia of the massive slide, results in a manageable recoil impulse without resorting to the gas operation of the Desert Eagle and Wildey designs. The absence of any small, easily fouled gas ports makes the LAR Grizzly capable of firing cast lead bullets reliably.

The Grizzly utilizes a standard 1911 Commander length barrel bushing to accommodate the greater excursion of the slide and associated swing of the barrel required to feed and eject the long .45 WM cartridge. In spite of this, the bushing tends to develop skirt cracks after hundreds of rounds of full-power loads. As the bushing skirt fails, the point of impact will drift downward.

The Grizzly pistol design does not utilize the double-tapered barrel tenon accuracy enhancement patented by Perry Arnett.

Non-standard parts
Most of the small parts used in the Grizzly Mark I pistol are standard parts per the 1911 ordnance drawings. Some parts however are not interchangeable due to the increased front to rear depth of the magazine well:

 Magazines: The magazine well is extended to accommodate the .45 Winchester Magnum cartridge, and the magazines are similarly deeper front to back. Magazines for 10mm and .45 ACP contain a sheet metal insert that reduces the effective cartridge length capacity of the magazine. Magazines intended to chamber the 10mm round have modified feed lips and longitudinal grooves reducing the width of the feed channel. The overall magazine dimensions are identical to the standard .45 Winchester Magnum magazine. LAR Grizzly pistols modified to accept standard 10mm magazines exist, but this was not a factory modification.
 Trigger: The Grizzly trigger bow is longer than the 1911.
 Extractor: The extractor head is about 0.4 inch longer than the M1911.
 Firing pin: Longer than that of the 1911.
 Barrel: Longer barrel hood than the 1911.
 Recoil spring: 27 pound tension.
 Plunger spring: Longer than the 1911.

See also
AMT AutoMag
IMI Desert Eagle
Wildey

References

External links
 L.A.R. Manufacturing Inc.
 LAR Grizzly Handgun Owners Blog
 LAR Grizzly: A 1911 on .45 Winchester Magnum Steroids by Forgotten Weapons

Perry Arnett Patents at the USPTO related to the LAR Grizzly pistol:
 Firearm of Interconvertible Calibers
 Accuracy Device for Semi-automatic Pistols
 Sub-calibre Firearm

Semi-auto magnum pistols
.357 Magnum firearms
10mm Auto semi-automatic pistols
.44 Magnum firearms
.45 ACP semi-automatic pistols
.50 caliber handguns
1911 platform
Semi-automatic pistols of the United States